Markowice  is a village in the administrative district of Gmina Strzelno, within Mogilno County, Kuyavian-Pomeranian Voivodeship, in north-central Poland.

The landmark of Markowice is the Baroque Oblates of Mary Immaculate monastery with the Church of the Visitation.

Sports
The local football club is Kujawy Markowice. It competes in the lower leagues.

Notable people
  (1809–1881), poet, participant of the November Uprising, sybirak
 Ulrich von Wilamowitz-Moellendorff (1848–1931), classical philologist

References

Markowice